The 1944–45 UCLA Bruins men's basketball team represented the University of California, Los Angeles during the 1944–45 NCAA men's basketball season and were members of the Pacific Coast Conference. The Bruins were led by sixth year head coach Wilbur Johns. They finished the regular season with a record of 11–12 and won the  PCC southern division for the first time with a record of 3–1.

Previous season

The Bruins finished the regular season with a record of 10–10 and were second in the PCC southern division with a record of 3–3.

Roster

Schedule

|-
!colspan=9 style=|Regular Season

|-
!colspan=9 style=|Conference Championship

Source

References

UCLA Bruins men's basketball seasons
Ucla
UCLA Bruins Basketball
UCLA Bruins Basketball